Banbury Museum & Gallery is a local museum in the town of Banbury, north Oxfordshire, England.

The museum is located in the centre of Banbury by the Oxford Canal. Its displays present the history of the town. They include the English Civil War, Banbury as a market town in Victorian times, the Oxford Canal, and Tooley's Boatyard next to the museum. The boatyard is a scheduled ancient monument that can be visited on a guided tour. The museum's collections include 17th century costumes.

Banbury Museum & Gallery is run by the Banbury Museum Trust. It was previously located near Banbury Cross. The current location is near Spiceball Park. An architectural design competition was launched by Cherwell District Council and RIBA Competitions to design the new Museum building. The Competition was won by ECD Architects of London and the new building opened in 2002. It is accessible over a bridge from the Castle Quay Shopping Centre or via Spiceball Park Road. Admission to the museum is free. The town's tourist information centre is located in the museum entrance in the Castle Quay Shopping Centre.

See also
 List of museums in Oxfordshire
 History of Banbury, Oxfordshire
 Museum of Oxford

References

External links

 Banbury Museum website

Museums established in 2002
Banbury
Local museums in Oxfordshire
2002 establishments in England